Gustav Ørsøe Christensen (born 7 September 2004) is a Danish professional footballer who plays as a winger for Midtjylland.

Professional career
Christensen is a youth product of Ikast and Midtjylland, and worked his way up the latter's youth systems before being promoted to their reserves in 2022. On 26 September 2019, he signed his first professional contract with Midtjylland. He made his professional and senior debut with Midtjylland as a late substitute in a 6–0 Danish Cup win over FA 2000 on 19 October 2022, where he scored his side's 5th goal.

International career
Christensen is a youth international for Denmark, having played for the Denmark U19s.

References

External links
 
 DBU Profile

2004 births
Living people
People from Ikast-Brande Municipality
Danish men's footballers
Denmark youth international footballers
Association football forwards
FC Midtjylland players